Borjmuri (also Romanized as Borjmūrī; also known as Borj Marvī) is a village in Pain Velayat Rural District, Razaviyeh District, Mashhad County, Razavi Khorasan Province, Iran. At the 2006 census, its population was 79, in 21 families.

References 

Populated places in Mashhad County